The 1985 New Jersey gubernatorial election was held on November 5, 1985. Incumbent Republican Governor Thomas Kean won a landslide re-election against the Democratic candidate, Essex County Executive Peter Shapiro. Kean was the first Republican to be re-elected governor since 1949, and the first Republican to ever win two four-year terms.

Primary elections were held on June 4. Kean was unopposed for the Republican nomination. In the Democratic primary, Shapiro prevailed over strong competition from Senate President John F. Russo and Newark mayor Kenneth A. Gibson. Stephen B. Wiley and Robert Del Tufo ran competitive campaigns but finished well behind the top three.

The general election was a foregone conclusion in favor of the popular incumbent. Kean won 564 out of 567 municipalities (all except Audubon Park, Chesilhurst, and Roosevelt) and a 62% majority among African-American voters, a remarkable margin for a modern Republican candidate. Kean's coattails led the Republicans to win the General Assembly for the first time since the 1971 elections. As of 2022, Kean is the last Republican to win Essex and Hudson counties in a statewide election and the last candidate of any party to carry every county. Until 2021, this was the last election where the winning candidate was of the same party as the sitting President.

Republican primary

Results
Incumbent Governor Thomas Kean was unopposed in the Republican primary election.

Democratic primary

Candidates
Robert Del Tufo, former U.S. Attorney for the District of New Jersey
Kenneth A. Gibson, mayor of Newark
Elliot Greenspan, president of the New Jersey chapter of the National Democratic Policy Committee
John F. Russo, State Senator from Toms River and Senate Majority Leader
Peter Shapiro, Essex County Executive and former State Assemblyman
Stephen B. Wiley, former State Senator from Morris Township

Declined
James Florio, U.S. Representative from Camden and nominee for Governor in 1981

Results

General election

Candidates
George M. Fishman, retired social studies teacher (Communist)
Virginia Flynn, word processor and Universal Life Church minister (Libertarian)
Rodger Headrick, real estate salesman (The True Light)
Julius Levin, apartment manager (Socialist Labor)
Thomas Kean, incumbent Governor since 1982 (Republican)
Mark Satinoff, sheet metal worker (Socialist Workers)
Peter Shapiro, Essex County Executive and former Assemblyman (Democratic)

Campaign

Kean was riding on high popularity ratings from voters on account of the good economic situation of the state in the 1980s including a surplus in the state budget. 

His efforts to aid depressed cities through Urban Enterprise Zones and reaching out to groups not typically associated with the Republicans including African Americans and labor unions led to endorsements from black ministers, Coretta Scott King, the AFL–CIO, and The New York Times. 

Shapiro ran on a platform of reducing car insurance rates, the state's high property taxes, and improvement of the environment but his struggles of fundraising due to New Jersey being located in two expensive media markets (New York City and Philadelphia) and Kean's momentum left his campaign little-received.

Polling

Results

References

External links
U.S. Election Atlas
October 28 analysis of the race by Prof. Cliff Zukin of the Eagleton Institute of Politics

1985
Gubernatorial
New Jersey
November 1985 events in the United States